A needlegun, also known as a needler, flechette gun or fletcher, is a firearm that fires small, sometimes fin-stabilized, metal darts or flechettes. Theoretically, the advantages of a needlegun over conventional projectile firearms are in its compact size, high rate of fire, and extreme muzzle velocity. The needle presents less frontal area than a bullet, producing less drag and thus more effective range (especially in water) than a wider projectile of the same mass and velocity. There have been experiments to make guided flechettes that can home in on targets.

Pre-industrial 
The first projectiles in early gun systems dating from the 14th century were typically hand wrought iron flechettes wrapped in a leather sabot. However, due to the expense and trouble of making these darts in a pre-industrial society, they were soon replaced with the less accurate stone cannonball.

World War I

Flechettes again came into mass use in the years before World War I. Starting as early as 1910, the French began experimenting with air-dropped flechettes; flechettes dropped from planes were used extensively during the war.

Vietnam War
A June 1978 issue of Gallery Magazine quotes L. Fletcher Prouty observing a test of flechette weapons in 1960 and the testimony of William E. Colby in the Church Committee on September 16 to 18, 1975 describing flechette weapons. Charles A. Senseney testified that he was a project engineer of the M-1 dart launcher that was described as resembling a M1911 pistol with a sight mount at the top.

Senseney claimed the M-1 was designed for the US Army Special Forces to be used in the Vietnam war but never got there due to not being able to get into the US Army's logistics system in time. Flechette ammunition encased in a sabot was available for the M-16, shotguns, and other weapons for use in Vietnam.

Underwater
A June 1965 Esquire magazine story on the making of the then-upcoming James Bond film Thunderball featured drawings of dart firing pistols that were not used in the completed film.

At the same time several makes of underwater firearms fired a steel bolt just over 4 inches long (but without fins).

Special Purpose Individual Weapon

The Special Purpose Individual Weapon was a long-running United States Army program to develop, in part, a workable XM-216 flechette-based "rifle", though other concepts were also involved. The concepts continued to be tested under the Future Rifle Program and again in the 1980s and 1990s under the Advanced Combat Rifle program, but neither program resulted in a system useful enough to warrant replacing the current M16.

In fiction 

In Marko Kloos's Frontlines series of novels, the military commonly use M66 flechette rifles and pistols putting out rounds of thousands a minute.

In William Gibson's novel Neuromancer, the character Molly Millions uses a flechette pistol.

In Neal Stephenson's novel Snow Crash, characters use a modified version of a needle/railgun called Reason.

In Michael Moorcock's Jerry Cornelius stories, the title character uses a transistorized needlegun.

In Terry Brooks's Genesis of Shannara stories, multiple characters use flechette guns.

In TSR's 1982 science fiction role-playing game Star Frontiers, a "needler" was a common weapon with multiple variations existing in the game. 

In Bungie's 1996 video game sequel, Marathon Infinity, the KKV-7 10mm SMG Flechette makes its debut and introduces the player to an extreme rate of fire.

In the Halo video games, originally developed by Bungie, the Needler is an alien weapon that fires homing crystalline needles that explode after a delay. In 2010, the Needle Rifle was introduced to the series with the release of Halo: Reach. 

In Call of Duty: Black Ops 4, a flechette rifle called the S6 Stingray can be unlocked. It is a two-round burst tactical rifle firing high damage serrated projectiles. Impact blasting projectiles can be equipped for maximum damage.

In Fallout 2 there is a pistol variant of flechette firing weapons known as the "Needler Pistol".

In the videogame F.E.A.R., there are several 10mm flechette nailguns.

In the fictional universe of Warhammer 40,000, Needleguns are occasionally mentioned as being used by non-military combatants, such as inquisitors and assassins.

In Frank Herbert's Dune novel, many organizations and houses wielded flechette projectile weapons, and a needlegun is featured in the film adaptation as a pistol wielded by Gurney Halleck.

In Robert A Heinlein's novel The Number of the Beast, the character Deety (Deja Thoris Burroughs-Carter) owns an illegal flechette pistol for self-defence.

In David Weber's Honorverse, several factions use flechette guns.

In K. A. Applegate's Animorphs, The alien race of Howlers use flechette guns.

See also
 Nail gun
 SCMITR
 Steyr ACR
 6.5×25mm CBJ

References 

Flechette firearms
Trial and research firearms